Milivoje Kostic (also, Milivoje M. Kostic; in Serbian Cyrillic: Миливоје Костић; born 20 March 1952 in Bioska, Užice municipality, Yugoslavia), is a Serbian-American thermodynamicist and professor emeritus of mechanical engineering at Northern Illinois University, Licensed Professional Engineer (PE) in Illinois, and Editor-in-Chief of the Thermodynamics section of the journal Entropy. He is an expert in energy fundamentals and applications, including nanotechnology, with emphasis on efficiency, efficient energy use and energy conservation, and environment and sustainability.

Biography 
Milivoje Kostic was born and raised in Serbia (Yugoslavia at the time). He completed his "Dipl-Ing" (Diploma Engineer) degree in Mechanical Engineering at the University of Belgrade in 1975, with the distinction of having the highest GPA in the mechanical engineering program history at the time. Then he worked as a researcher in thermal engineering and combustion at Vinca Institute for Nuclear Sciences, which then hosted the headquarters of the International Center for Heat and Mass Transfer (ICHMT), and later taught at the University of Belgrade. In meantime, he spent three summers as an exchange visitor in England, West Germany, and the former Soviet Union. Kostic came to the University of Illinois at Chicago in 1981 as a Fulbright grantee, where he received his Ph.D. in mechanical engineering in 1984. He subsequently worked several years in industry before emigrated to the United States in 1986. After working for 26 years at Northern Illinois University, he retired in 2014 to focus on his fundamental research, and became Professor Emeritus in 2015.

Professional work 

As of 2022, Kostic was the Section Editor-in-Chief of the Thermodynamics Section of the journal Entropy, published by MDPI, having previously been a Guest Editor of two special issues on Entropy and the Second Law of Thermodynamics.

Kostic has also worked in industry and has authored a number of patents and professional publications, including invited articles in professional encyclopedias.

Professor Kostic was appointed as NASA faculty fellow, and Fermi and Argonne National Laboratories faculty researcher. He has a number of professional awards and recognitions, is a frequent keynote plenary speaker at international conferences and at different educational and public institutions, as well as member of several professional societies and scientific advisory boards. Entransy concept and controversies

Kostic is interested in the fundamental laws of nature, thermodynamics and heat transfer fundamentals and applications, and especially the Second law of thermodynamics and entropy., see also arXiv e-prints. He has developed a collaboration with Tsinghua and other Chinese universities. Kostic wrote about Entransy concept and controversies, and is editing an Entropy special Issue, Nature of heat and entropy, as well as a Topical collection, Foundations and Ubiquity of Classical Thermodynamics.

More recently Kostic has raised some critical issues regarding the challenges of the Second Law of thermodynamics, including a number of puzzling issues still surrounding thermodynamics and the nature of heat, epitomized by the elusive Maxwell's demon. Namely, he argued that Maxwell and his followers focused on 'effortless gating' a molecule at a time, but overlooked simultaneous interference of other chaotic molecules, while the demon exorcists tried to justify impossible processes with misplaced 'compensations' by work of measurements and gate operation, and information storage and memory erasure with entropy generation. Some other unjustified claims, fundamentally misplaced and dramatized, like “heat flowing from cold to hot without external intervention,”  have been critically analyzed and demystified by Kostic.

References

External links
 Professor Kostic's Website at Northern Illinois University.
 Kostic's profile in Hmolpedia, an Encyclopedia of Human Thermodynamics.
 Professor Kostic's Google Site.
 RTS-Radio Televizija Srbija -Professor Milivoje Kostic
 TV-LAV Dnevnik - Professor Milivoje Kostic.
 TV-LAV Razglednica iz Amerike - TV Interview with Professor Milivoje Kostic
 An Assay in "Prodavci Znanja (Knowledge Dealers)" book by Srecko Stopic (in Serbian, 2009)
 Could Knowledge be Excessive: Computers will have larger influence in the future than the mass production to date (in a Serbian newspaper, 1986)
 "No progress without creativity" & "The best is fired" (in Serbian newspapers, 1985 & 1988)

1952 births
Living people
Thermodynamicists
American mechanical engineers
Northern Illinois University faculty
American editors
Nanotechnology
American people of Serbian descent
People from Užice
University of Belgrade Faculty of Mechanical Engineering alumni
Serbian engineers